Luciobarbus steindachneri is a species of cyprinid fish. It is here placed in Luciobarbus following the IUCN, but that genus is very closely related to the other typical barbels and perhaps better considered a mere subgenus of Barbus.

This large barbel can reach a length of almost  when adult. It is endemic to the Iberian Peninsula, where it is found in both Portugal and Spain. It occurs in deep, slow-moving rivers and reservoirs of the middle and lower Guadiana and Tagus River's drainage basins. Abundant growth of water plants seems to be necessary for it to thrive.

It has declined by more than a third since the late 1990s, and it is not a common species anymore; it is classified as Vulnerable by the IUCN. The main cause of its decline is unsustainable use of water resources, such as water pollution, extraction for agriculture and damming. Introduced exotic fishes pose an additional problem. L. steindachneri is listed as Protected Species in Appendix III of the Convention on the Conservation of European Wildlife and Natural Habitats.

See also
 Water supply and sanitation in Spain#Links to water resources

References

  (2008): Natural hybridization of Barbus bocagei x Barbus comizo (Cyprinidae) in Tagus River basin, central Spain [English with French abstract]. Cybium 32(2): 99-102. PDF fulltext
  (2007): Evolutionary origin of Lake Tana's (Ethiopia) small Barbus species: indications of rapid ecological divergence and speciation. Anim. Biol. 57(1): 39–48.  (HTML abstract)

Luciobarbus
Cyprinid fish of Europe
Endemic fish of the Iberian Peninsula
Fish described in 1967
Taxa named by Carlos Alberto da Silva Almaça
Taxonomy articles created by Polbot